The Panchayat is a political system, originating from the Indian subcontinent, found mainly in India, Pakistan, Bangladesh, Sri Lanka, and Nepal.

Panchayat may also refer to:

 Panchayat (Nepal), the political system of Nepal from 1960 to 1990
 Panchayati raj (India), system introduced by constitutional amendment in 1992
 Panchayat samiti (block), rural local governments (panchayats) at the intermediate level in panchayat raj institutions (PRI)
 Panchayat (film), A Nepali film
 Panchayat (TV series), an Indian web series
 Panchayat (1996 film), an Indian Punjabi film by Surinder Walia, starring Yograj Singh
 Caste panchayat, based on caste system in India
 Gram Panchayat, the grassroots-level of panchayati raj formalised local self-governance system in India
 Nyaya panchayat, a system of dispute resolution at village level in India
 Town Panchayat (T.P.), a town

See also
 Local self-government in India
 Sarpanch